Kurt Bloch (born August 28, 1960) is an American songwriter, guitarist, engineer and record producer.

Music career
Bloch is best known as songwriter and lead guitarist of Fastbacks, and is a member of The Young Fresh Fellows.

Record Production
Bloch has recorded tracks and produced albums for The Presidents of the United States of America, Tokyo Dragons, Robyn Hitchcock, Les Thugs, Flop, Sicko, The Minus 5, The Venus 3, and more recently the Tall Birds.

Nashville Pussy's song "Fried Chicken and Coffee", produced by Bloch, was nominated for the 1999 Grammy Award for Best Metal Performance.

Thee Sgt. Major III
He is a member of Thee Sgt. Major III (earlier known as Sgt. Major), along with ex-Posies drummer Mike Musburger, The Young Fresh Fellows bassist Jim Sangster, and Cantona singer and guitarist Leslie Beattie. Bill Coury (ex-Visqueen) previously shared lead vocal duties, but has since left the band.

The Beltholes
Bloch plays guitar for and produces Seattle-based prog-rock band The Beltholes, who released the 2007 album "For Whom the Beltholes" on the Burn Burn Burn label. The band also includes Kwab Copeland and Fred Speakman (lead vocals), and Anthony Clementi (bass).

The Yes Masters
2017 saw the release of the self-titled debut by The Yes Masters, featuring Kurt Bloch (lead vocals, electric guitar, production, engineering), Rick Foundation (drums), and Matt Scientist (bass, vocals) on the No Threes label.

Filthy Friends
Also in 2017, Bloch joined Corin Tucker of Sleater Kinney, Peter Buck of R.E.M., Scott McCaughey and Linda Pitmon to form the band Filthy Friends and release their album Invitation. Bill Rieflin has also been cited as a drummer in the band.

Discography

The Beltholes
 2007: For Whom The Beltholes (Burn Burn Burn Records)

Fastbacks
See Fastbacks discography

Sgt. Major
 2004: Rich, Creamery Butter (Book Records BOOK 6)

Thee Sgt. Major
LP
 2010: The Idea Factory (Book Records)
Single
 2009: Ice Cold Ten (Book Records)

The Yes Masters
 2017: The Yes Masters (No Threes Records N3-017)

The Young Fresh Fellows
See The Young Fresh Fellows discography

References

External links

 
 
 Ralph Bevins, Art Zone: Kurt Bloch, Seattle Channel, September 18, 2015

1960 births
Living people
American rock guitarists
American male guitarists
American record producers
The Minus 5 members
The Young Fresh Fellows members
20th-century American guitarists
20th-century American male musicians
Filthy Friends members